Belle Isle Northeast Light is a  tall, 12-sided flying buttress lighthouse located on Belle Isle, Newfoundland, which was built in 1905. It is one of three lighthouses on the island and was maintained by the Canadian Government despite the fact that Newfoundland did not join Confederation until 1949.  It was designed by William P. Anderson as one in a series of nine buttressed lighthouses built in Canada around 1910.

Its light characteristic is a white flash occurring every eleven seconds. A fog signal consisting of a single blast may be sounded every 30 seconds if needed.

See also
 List of lighthouses in Newfoundland and Labrador
 List of lighthouses in Canada

References

External links
Picture of Belle Isle Northeast Lighthouse
 Aids to Navigation Canadian Coast Guard

Lighthouses completed in 1905
Lighthouses in Newfoundland and Labrador
1905 establishments in the British Empire